Fergus (Juergensen Field) Airport  is located  northwest of Fergus, Ontario, Canada.

See also
 List of airports in the Fergus area

References

Registered aerodromes in Ontario
Centre Wellington